Jennifer Black is a Scottish actress notable for playing Stella Urquhart in the film Local Hero and DCS Gill Templer in the TV series Rebus. She has also appeared in The Bill, River City, Hi De Hi and Taggart. 

After leaving school, she studied at the Royal Scottish Academy of Music and Drama and went on to work for a time in repertory at Crewe, before moving to London for four years. She then moved back to Scotland and has since been performing regularly in theatrical productions, along with her occasional TV and film work.

References

External links
 

Living people
Scottish television actresses
Scottish film actresses
Year of birth missing (living people)
Alumni of the Royal Conservatoire of Scotland
20th-century Scottish actresses
21st-century Scottish actresses